Phi Cassiopeiae (φ Cas, φ Cassiopeiae) is a star in the constellation Cassiopeia. φ Cassiopeiae is a multiple star with a combined apparent magnitude of +4.95. The two brightest components are A and C, sometimes called φ1 and φ2 Cas. φ Cas A is an F0 bright supergiant of magnitude 4.95 and φ Cas C is a 7.08 magnitude B6 supergiant at 134".

System

φ Cassiopeiae appears among the stars of the open cluster NGC 457, which is at 2,400pc, but it is uncertain whether it is a member of the cluster. φ Cas is generally treated as having five component stars, designated A to E in order of distance from the brightest star. The two components A and C are the brightest members of NGC 457; they are sometimes referred to as φ1 and φ2 Cassiopeiae.  Component B is a 12th magnitude star 49" from φ1. Components D and E and both 10th magnitude B-type main sequence stars in NGC 457, with component E only 42" from φ2.  Another three components are sometimes listed as components of the multiple system, although this is somewhat arbitrary with dozens of members of NGC 457 being found within a few arc-minutes.

The two supergiants share a similar space motion to the other stars in NGC 457, but their evolutionary status and brightness makes them unlikely members.  Their Gaia Data Release 2 parallaxes are comparable to other stars in the cluster and consistent with the accepted distance of NGC 457, and component C has been given a 70% likelihood of being a member of the cluster.

Properties
The primary component of the φ Cassiopeiae system is a very luminous yellow supergiant. Its absolute magnitude is comparable to some yellow hypergiants but it does not show the level of mass loss and instability that would qualify it as a hypergiant itself. More uncertain is the mass, which would be expected to have been well over  initially, but much less now.

Component C is a relatively typical B class supergiant, 83,000 times the luminosity of the sun.  It is a suspected variable and a suspected spectroscopic binary.

See also
Rho Cassiopeiae

References

Cassiopeiae, Phi
Cassiopeia (constellation)
F-type supergiants
Cassiopeiae, 34
007902
0382
B-type supergiants
Double stars
006242
Durchmusterung objects